is a Japanese former professional baseball catcher who is currently a manager for the Hinokuni Salamanders of Kyusyu Independence professional baseball league. He has played in Nippon Professional Baseball (NPB) for the Seibu Lions/Saitama Seibu Lions, Fukuoka SoftBank Hawks, Tohoku Rakuten Golden Eagles and Chiba Lotte Marines.

Career

Playing career

On September 22, 2002, Hosokawa made his NPB debut.

On November 9, 2020, Hosokawa announced his retirement.

Managing career
On December 8, 2020, Hosoya become manager for the Hinokuni Salamanders of Kyusyu Independence professional baseball league.

References

External links

1980 births
Living people
Aomori University alumni
Baseball people from Aomori Prefecture
Chiba Lotte Marines players
Fukuoka SoftBank Hawks players
Hiranai, Aomori
Japanese baseball players
Nippon Professional Baseball catchers
Saitama Seibu Lions players
Seibu Lions players
Tohoku Rakuten Golden Eagles players